Milton Luiz de Souza Filho (born 11 November 1961), shortened to Milton, is a Brazilian footballer. He competed in the men's tournament at the 1988 Summer Olympics. He spent the majority of his club career, eight years, in Switzerland playing for four different clubs.

Honours

Player
FC Sion
Swiss Championship: 1996–97
Swiss Cup: 1994–95, 1996–97

References

External links
 

1961 births
Living people
Brazilian footballers
Nacional Futebol Clube players
Coritiba Foot Ball Club players
Como 1907 players
FC Chiasso players
FC Zürich players
FC Sion players
FC St. Gallen players
Association football midfielders
Serie A players
Swiss Super League players
Brazilian expatriate footballers
Expatriate footballers in Italy
Brazilian expatriate sportspeople in Italy
Expatriate footballers in Switzerland
Brazilian expatriate sportspeople in Switzerland
Brazil international footballers
Olympic footballers of Brazil
Footballers at the 1988 Summer Olympics
Footballers from Rio de Janeiro (city)
Olympic silver medalists for Brazil
Olympic medalists in football
Medalists at the 1988 Summer Olympics